Séverine Marie Paule Deneulin (born 15 January 1974) is a senior lecturer in International Development at the Department of Social and Policy Sciences, University of Bath, and a fellow of the Human Development and Capability Association (HDCA); she is also the HDCA's secretary with a place on the executive council.

Deneulin's main areas of research are in development issues and Amartya Sen's capability approach.  She is the author of a number of articles and books on the subject including, Wellbeing, justice and development ethics as part of Routledge's human development and capability debates series.

Education 
Deneulin gained her MSc in economics from the University of Louvain, Belgium and a DPhil in Development Studies from the University of Oxford.

Bibliography

Books 
 
 
 
 
  Pdf. E-book.

Chapters in books

Journal articles 
 
 
 
 
 
 
Secularism and the public-private divide: a response to David Lehmann was a response to this article: 
 
 
 
 
 
 
  Pdf version.

Papers 
  Pdf version.
  Pdf version.
  Pdf version.
  Pdf version.
  Pdf version.
  Pdf version.
  Pdf version.

See also 
 Feminist economics
 List of feminist economists

References

External links 
 Profile page: Séverine Deneulin University of Bath

1974 births
Academics of the University of Bath
Alumni of the University of Oxford
Development economists
Feminist economists
Feminist philosophers
Living people
Université catholique de Louvain alumni